Valentin Vacherot was the defending champion but lost in the quarterfinals to Beibit Zhukayev.

Arthur Cazaux won the title after defeating Omar Jasika 7–6(8–6), 6–4 in the final.

Seeds

Draw

Finals

Top half

Bottom half

References

External links
Main draw
Qualifying draw

Nonthaburi Challenger II - 1